Land and Houses Public Company Limited (also known as Land and Houses) is a large real-estate based company in Thailand. It was established in 1983 by Ms Piangjai Harnpanij and her son, Mr Anant Asavabhokhin. The company became listed on the Stock Exchange of Thailand in 1991. As of end 2019, Mr Anant Asavabhokin and his family comprised the largest shareholder group, holding 30.73% of the shares.

References

External links
 Land and Houses
 Land and Houses Bank

Real estate companies of Thailand
Real estate companies established in 1983
Companies listed on the Stock Exchange of Thailand
Companies based in Bangkok
1983 establishments in Thailand